The  Walter Atom is an air-cooled horizontal two-cylinder engine used on light aircraft.  The Atom is a Czechoslovakian engine first produced in 1934.

Specifications (Atom)

See also

References

http://www.oldengine.org/members/diesel/Duxford/czechaer1.htm

Boxer engines
1930s aircraft piston engines
Atom
Air-cooled aircraft piston engines